James Laurence Elliott (born August 18, 1943) is a former American football player who played for Pittsburgh Steelers of the National Football League (NFL). He played college football at Presbyterian College.

References

1944 births
Living people
Pittsburgh Steelers players
Presbyterian Blue Hose football players
American football punters